Kim Shaw (born May 20, 1984) is a Canadian-born American actress.

Early life and education
Shaw grew up in Miami and Longwood, Florida. After graduating from Lake Brantley High School, Shaw moved to New York City to attend the American Academy of Dramatic Arts.

Career
Her first lead role was In 2007 when she starred opposite Paul Sorvino in the independent film Greetings from the Shore. She has been in two films with Sarah Jessica Parker: Sex and the City (2008) and Did You Hear About the Morgans? (2009). Recurring characters on TV include Amber Madison on The Good Wife, Tina Bradley on MTV's comedy series I Just Want My Pants Back and Dr. Cassie Williams in Canada's number one drama, CTV's Saving Hope.

At the 9th Canadian Screen Awards in 2021, Shaw won the award for Best Lead Performance in a Television Movie for her performance in the film The Lead.

Filmography

Film

Television

References

External links 

Actresses from Windsor, Ontario
American film actresses
American television actresses
Living people
1984 births
Actresses from Miami
People from Longwood, Florida
Lake Brantley High School alumni
20th-century American actresses
21st-century American actresses
American Academy of Dramatic Arts alumni
Canadian Screen Award winners